Johann Leonard Hoffmann (1710–1782) was a Maastricht army surgeon and amateur geologist who collected fossils from the local Mount Saint Peter. He is known for fossils named after him, and was one of the three people contacted on the discovery of the Mosasaurus in 1766, and especially the second one in the 1770s known as "le grand animal", that was later taken to Paris by the French Revolutionary Army in 1794.

History

In 1798 Barthélemy Faujas de Saint-Fond published his first volume of a monumental natural history series, called Histoire naturelle de la montagne de Saint-Pierre de Maestricht, which also contained an account of the circumstances of the find. According to him Dr Hoffmann paid the quarrymen when they informed him of fossil finds. When the second skull was found in 1770, Hoffmann supposedly lead the excavation. Afterwards another local amateur geologist, the local canon priest Theodorus Joannes Godding (1722–1797), claimed his rights as landowner and forced Hoffmann to relinquish his ownership through a lawsuit, won by influencing the court. Whether or not this story was based on fact, De Saint-Fond saved the specimen for science, promising a considerable reward to Godding to compensate for his loss. However, of this famous story very little can be substantiated by archival evidence. Godding was the original owner, Hoffmann never possessed the fossil, and there was no lawsuit. Faujas de Saint-Fond probably never paid anything and the entire account seems to have been fabricated by him to liven up his book. The local army luitenant Jean Baptiste Drouin was also an avid collector of fossil specimens, and both Drouin and Hoffmann were in correspondence with the famous amateur geologist Petrus Camper about the finds. Camper postulated that the animal was a whale, or in any case a sea creature, rather than a land creature. Faujas de Saint-Fond insisted it was a crocodile, while Camper's son Adriaan claimed it was a monitor lizard and Georges Cuvier felt that it may be something as yet unknown, (the concept of extinction was new).

Much later, Hermann Schlegel accused Hoffmann of falsifying his observations of the fossil. Schlegel was the first to discover that the limbs were actually flippers.

Other fossils that are named after Hoffmann are the giant turtle Allopleuron and another monitor lizard Varanus.

References

Dinosaurs and Other Extinct Saurians: A Historical Perspective,  edited by Richard Moody, E. Buffetaut, D. Naish, D. M. Martill on Google books
 Histoire naturelle de la montagne de Saint-Pierre de Maestricht, by Barthélemy Faujas de Saint-Fond on Google books
 , a 5th generation descendant of Johann Leonard Hoffmann about his forbear's experience with the Mosasaurus on YouTube from 100th anniversary Natuurhistorisch Museum Maastricht and 350th anniversary Stadsbibliotheek Maastricht

1710 births
1782 deaths
Amateur geologists
People from Maastricht
Dutch paleontologists
Dutch surgeons